Armida is an opera in three acts by Josef Mysliveček set to a libretto by Giovanni Ambrogio Migliavacca based on an earlier libretto by Philippe Quinault. It is one of many operas set at the time of the Crusades that is based on characters and incidents from Torquato Tasso's epic poem La Gerusalemme liberata. This opera (and all the rest of Mysliveček's operas) belong to the serious type in Italian language referred to as opera seria.  It incorporates many elements from the operatic "reform" movement of the 1770s, including short vocal numbers and short choruses incorporated into the fabric of the drama and lavish use of accompanied recitative.

Performance history

The opera was first performed at the Teatro alla Scala in Milan on 26 December 1779 to open the theater's operatic carnival season of 1780 as one of the earliest operas ever performed there. It was a spectacular failure that necessitated the substitution of many of the arias for works of Giuseppe Sarti and Francesco Bianchi.  The first performance of the opera since its first run in Milan took place in Lisbon on 22 May 2015 in the form of a semi scenic version sponsored by the Orquestra Metropolitana de Lisboa.

There is no reason to believe that an anonymous production of Armida staged in Lucca in 1778 made use of any of Mysliveček's music, in spite of multiple claims in the musicological literature that it constituted the original version of the Milan opera of 1780.

Connection with Mozart

One of the arias substituted out of the production was "Il caro mio bene" (Act III, scene 1), a vocal piece so much admired by Wolfgang Amadeus Mozart that he arranged it for voice and piano with the new text "Ridente la calma," K. 152 (210a). In this form, it would become one of his most frequently-performed concert arias. The aria was originally sung by Mysliveček's friend and professional collaborator Luigi Marchesi in the role of Rinaldo. The tenor Valentin Adamberger, who would create the role of Belmonte in Mozart's opera Die Entführung aus dem Serail in Vienna in 1782, was also present as a cast member.

Roles

Vocal set pieces
(taken from the score in the Ajuda Palace in Lisbon,
the only complete score of the opera)

Act I, scene 1 - Aria of Fenicia, "Perche d'affano oppressa" 
Act I, scene 2 - Aria of Sidonia, "Vuoi che turbi" 
Act I, scene 3 - Aria of Armida, "So che amor lusinga" 
Act I, scene 4 - Aria of Idraote, "Molto soffrir condanna" 
Act I, scene 6 - Chorus with Fenicia, "L'orme seguiam d'Armida" 
Act I, scene 7 - Duet for Armida and Idraote, "Ah, del fellon nel sangue" 
Act I, scene 8 - Aria of Rinaldo, "Dal mio core amor" 
Act I, scene 8 - Accompanied recitative for Idraote, "Qui si dimori" 
Act I, scene 9 - Accompanied recitative for Rinaldo, "Più queste spiaggie" 
Act I, scene 9 - Aria of Rinaldo, "Più non vi sento in seno" 
Act I, scene 10 - Aria of Artemidoro, "Se amica vuoi la sorte" 
Act I, scene 10 - Chorus with naiad and shepherdess, "Nel più felice tempo" 
Act I, scene 11 - Accompanied recitative for Armida, "Qual turbame" 
Act I, scene 11 - Aria of Armida, "Cedo l'armi il cor"

Act II, scene 1 - Aria of Ubaldo, "Di luce un raggio" 
Act II, scene 3 - Aria of Fenicia, "Arta vanta d'ogn'altra maggiore" 
Act II, scene 4 - Aria of Rinaldo, "Ah, disponi di mia sorte" 
Act II, scene 5 - Accompanied recitative for Armida, "Vieni, odio implacabile" 
Act II, scene 5 - Chorus of furies
Act II, scene 6 - Aria of Armida, "Se il mio duolo, se il mio fato" 
Act II, scene 7 - Aria of Odio, "Mi chiamerai ma in vano" 
Act II, scene 9 - Chorus with Lucinda, "Ecco la calma" 
Act II, scene 9 - Cavatina of Lucinda, "Qui senza stento" 
Act II, scene 9 - Duet for Lucinda and the Cavalier Danese, "Qual v'a più bel piacer" 
Act II, scene 11 - Cavatina of Melissa, "Perche veder deggio" 
Act II, scene 11 - Aria of Ubaldo, "Ah, troppo barbara ragion tiranna" 
Act II, scene 12 - Duet for Armida and Rinaldo, "È felice la mia sorte"

Act III, scene 1 - Aria for an "Amante fortunata" with chorus, "Il piacer tranquillo" 
Act III, scene 1 - Aria of Rinaldo, "Il caro mio bene" 
Act III, scene 2 - Aria of the Cavalier Danese, "Vieni ormai" 
Act III, scene 3 - Aria of Armida, "Idol mio, serena i rai e consola il tuo dolor" 
Act III, scene 4 - Accompanied recitative for Armida, "Il traditor Rinaldo"

References
Freeman, Daniel E. Josef Mysliveček, "Il Boemo." Sterling Heights, Mich.: Harmonie Park Press, 2009.

Italian-language operas
Operas by Josef Mysliveček
1780 operas
Opera seria
Operas
Operas based on works by Torquato Tasso
Opera world premieres at La Scala
Operas set in the Levant